Giovanni Paolo Maggini (c. 1580 - c. 1630), was a luthier born in Botticino (Brescia), Italy. Maggini was a pupil of the most important violin maker of the Brescian school, Gasparo da Salò.

Maggini's early instruments are now considered very desirable because, despite their apparent naive craftsmanship, they are wonderful instruments. They first tended to be modified copies of his teacher's instruments. But once established on his own around the year 1606, Maggini developed his skills and experimented with his designs until he achieved a level of expertise that is still highly regarded. His violas, like those of his master, are regarded as the best in the world for the rich deep sound and power of tone.

The only known pupil of Maggini is Valentino Siani, who worked with him c. 1610–1620, before he moved to Florence and started his own business.

Maggini succumbed to the Italian plague of 1629–31 that also took another important early luthier, Girolamo Amati. This fact arouses suspicions that some of Maggini's later works are perhaps creations from a different maker since tests reveal that some instruments bearing a genuine Maggini label are from trees living after Maggini's death.

The National Music Museum has two Maggini instruments in its collection. One is a bass viola da gamba.  The other is a violin.

The 18th-century European violin virtuoso-composer Ivan Mane Jarnović played a Maggini violin.

A genuine Maggini violin ranges in value from $200,000 to $2,000,000.

Pupils 
 Antonio Mariani

References

External links
Margaret Huggins. Gio: Paolo Maggini, his life and work (1892)

1580s births
1630s deaths
Italian luthiers
Businesspeople from Brescia